Stegodyphus is a genus of velvet spiders that was first described by Eugène Simon in 1873. They are distributed from Africa to Europe and Asia, with one species (S. manaus) found in Brazil. The name is derived from Ancient Greek  (stegos), meaning "covered".

At least three species are social spiders, and several are known to use ballooning as a method of dispersal.

Species
 it contains twenty species:
Stegodyphus africanus (Blackwall, 1866) – Africa
Stegodyphus bicolor (O. Pickard-Cambridge, 1869) – Southern Africa
Stegodyphus dufouri (Audouin, 1826) – North, West Africa
Stegodyphus dumicola Pocock, 1898 – Central, Southern Africa
Stegodyphus hildebrandti (Karsch, 1878) – Central, East Africa, Zanzibar
Stegodyphus hisarensis Arora & Monga, 1992 – India
Stegodyphus lineatus (Latreille, 1817) (type) – Southern Europe, North Africa to Tajikistan
Stegodyphus lineifrons Pocock, 1898 – East Africa
Stegodyphus manaus Kraus & Kraus, 1992 – Brazil
Stegodyphus manicatus Simon, 1876 – North, West Africa
Stegodyphus mimosarum Pavesi, 1883 – Africa, Madagascar
Stegodyphus mirandus Pocock, 1899 – India
Stegodyphus nathistmus Kraus & Kraus, 1989 – Morocco to Yemen
Stegodyphus pacificus Pocock, 1900 – Jordan, Iran, Pakistan, India
Stegodyphus sabulosus Tullgren, 1910 – East, Southern Africa
Stegodyphus sarasinorum Karsch, 1892 – India, Sri Lanka, Nepal, Myanmar
Stegodyphus simplicifrons Simon, 1906 – Madagascar
Stegodyphus tentoriicola Purcell, 1904 – South Africa
Stegodyphus tibialis (O. Pickard-Cambridge, 1869) – India, Myanmar, Thailand, China
Stegodyphus tingelin Kraus & Kraus, 1989 – Cameroon

References

Araneomorphae genera
Eresidae
Spiders of Africa
Spiders of Asia
Spiders of Brazil
Taxa named by Eugène Simon